Lethe bhairava  , the rusty forester, is a species of Satyrinae butterfly found in the  Indomalayan realm (Bhutan and Assam)

References

bhairava
Butterflies of Asia